In telecommunications, the Network Effectiveness Ratio (NER) measures the ability of a network to deliver a call to the called terminal. Busy signals and other call failure due to user behaviour are counted as "successful call delivery" for NER calculation purposes. Unlike ASR, NER excludes the effects of customer and terminal behaviour.  NER is a measure of network quality defined by the ITU.

In general, the Network Effective Ratio is used to calculate the effectiveness of the internal interconnect routes.

See also
ASR : Answer/Nb Address Complete Message
ABR : Answer/Nb of Initial Address Message

References

Telephony